Carl C. Taylor is an American softball coach, that is the Volunteer Assistant Coach at  Fairleigh Dickinson. He was the head coach of Drexel until June of 2021. He was the first coach in Rutgers University history to win a national championship when he led the 2006 Rutgers-Camden Softball team to national championship victory in Raleigh, North Carolina, defeating the reigning National Champions, University of St. Thomas.

Biography
After the  2007 season Taylor retired after 12 years as Rutgers-Camden's head softball coach. He was also drafted in the third round of the Major League Baseball draft in 1979 by the Pittsburgh Pirates, but did not play in a Major League game. In January 1981 he was signed by the Dodgers.

Coaching career

Drexel
On June 22, 2015, Taylor was announced as the new head coach of the Drexel softball program.

Head coaching record

College

References

Living people
Rutgers University faculty
Year of birth missing (living people)